The Joint Computer Conferences were a series of computer conferences in the United States held under various names between 1951 and 1987.  The conferences were the venue for presentations and papers representing "cumulative work in the [computer] field."
  
Originally a semi-annual pair, the Western Joint Computer Conference (WJCC) was held annually in the western United States, and a counterpart, the Eastern Joint Computer Conference (EJCC), was held annually in the eastern US.  Both conferences were sponsored by an organization known as the National Joint Computer Committee (NJCC), composed of the Association for Computing Machinery (ACM), the American Institute of Electrical Engineers (AIEE) Committee on Computing Devices, and the Institute of Radio Engineers (IRE) Professional Group on Electronic Computers.

In 1962 the American Federation of Information Processing Societies (AFIPS) took over sponsorship and renamed them Fall Joint Computer Conference (FJCC) and Spring Joint Computer Conference (SJCC).

In 1973 AFIPS merged the two conferences into a single annual National Computer Conference (NCC) which ran until discontinued in 1987.

The 1967 FJCC in Anaheim, California attracted 15,000 attendees. In 1968 in San Francisco, California Douglas Engelbart presented "The Mother of All Demos" presenting such then-new technologies as the computer mouse, video conferencing, teleconferencing, and hypertext.

Conference dates

Eastern Joint Computer Conference

Western Joint Computer Conference

Spring Joint Computer Conference

Fall Joint Computer Conference

National Computer Conference

See also
American Federation of Information Processing Societies
COMDEX

References

External links
AFIPS conference bibliography, 1951-1987

Computer conferences